The Mark 23 torpedo was a submarine-launched anti-surface ship torpedo designed and built by the Naval Torpedo Station for the United States Navy in World War II. It was essentially a Mark 14 torpedo, modified via the removal of its low-speed, long-range setting, leaving the high-speed, short-range feature in place.

It was developed with the high-speed feature of the Mark 14 torpedo in mind, as earlier in the war, the low-speed feature of the Mark 14 was rarely used. However, during the latter stages of the war, fewer targets and better tactics necessitated firing from longer ranges and the Mark 14, with its low-speed, long-range feature, became the preferred weapon. Many of the Mark 23s were scrapped or converted to Mark 14s, while other units were cannibalized for spare parts.

See also
American 21 inch torpedo

References

Torpedoes
Torpedoes of the United States
Unmanned underwater vehicles
World War II weapons of the United States